The Single Use Plastic Deathbed is an art installation at Freedom Ghat on the bank of Ganga river near Laxman Jhula in Rishikesh, Uttarakhand, India. It features three funeral pyres made from single use plastic waste. It was opened in December 2020.

History
Climate activist Aakash Ranison organised six waste cleanup drives in various tourist places in Rishikesh with help of volunteers in September 2020. Some of the collected plastic waste was used to built the installation with support of the Rishikesh Municipal Corporation and local people to create the awareness regarding ill effects of single use plastic. It was opened on 20 December 2020 on the International Human Solidarity Day.

Installation

There are three funeral pyres measuring 8 feet long, 3 feet wide and 3 feet high. Each of these pyres is made of 26 kg of single use plastic, an average amount of plastic waste generated by an Indian annually. These three pyres are built from common types of plastic waste: disposable bottles, disposable food packages and plastic containers respectively. There is a mirror in front of the pyres which implies that the person who is looking into it is responsible for the pyres.

See also
 Disposable product
 Marine Cemetery

References

Plastics and the environment
2020 establishments in Uttarakhand
Rishikesh